Taylor Eigsti (born September 24, 1984) is an American jazz pianist and composer. Eigsti's trio features bassist Harish Raghavan and drummer Eric Harland. He is also a member of Eric Harland Voyager, Kendrick Scott Oracle, and Gretchen Parlato's group.

Considered to be a child prodigy, since age 15 Eigsti has been a faculty member at the Stanford Jazz Workshop at Stanford University and has won a Grammy for his solo work.

Early life
Eigsti was born to Nancy and Steve Eigsti on September 24, 1984 and grew up in Menlo Park, California. When he was three, his 17-year-old sister, Shannon, died of cancer. Her death made a lasting impression and continued to influence Eigsti's musical development. Eigsti's study of piano began at age four when he was inspired by his older sister, Shannon. He graduated salutatorian of his high school class at Woodside Priory School, where he returned to give the Commencement Address in 2010. He then had a brief stint at the University of Southern California's Thornton School of Music before dropping out, midway through his sophomore year, to pursue his musical career.

Musical career
New York-based pianist and composer Taylor Eigsti started playing the piano when he was four years old. Growing up in Menlo Park, California, Eigsti was quickly labeled a prodigy, and has since released 7 albums as a bandleader, in addition to appearing on over 50 albums as a sideman. Eigsti has garnered multiple individual GRAMMY Award nominations over the years for his work as a recording artist and composer, including Best Instrumental Composition, and Best Jazz Instrumental Solo. Eigsti also co-wrote a featured composition with Don Cheadle for the 2017 GRAMMY-winning soundtrack to the motion picture "Miles Ahead".

Eigsti has traveled internationally with his trio and quartet, and has frequently performed as a sideman since moving to New York City in 2008. Eigsti has performed at the Hollywood Bowl, Carnegie Hall, Salle Pleyel, Red Rocks Amphitheatre, Royal Festival Hall, Konzerthaus, Vienna, Olympia Hall, Massey Hall, Lincoln Center for the Performing Arts, Louise M. Davies Symphony Hall, and many festivals including Montreal International Jazz Festival, North Sea Jazz Festival, Mosaic Music Festival (Singapore), Monterey Jazz Festival, Stockholm Jazz Festival, Istanbul International Jazz Festival, Quito Jazz Festival, Jakarta International Java Jazz Festival, Sydney Jazz Festival, Newport Jazz Festival, Chicago Jazz Festival, Toronto Jazz Festival.

Eigsti has also been featured numerous times in various television specials, NPR appearances, commercials, and composed the theme music to the motion picture "Detachment" starring Oscar-winner Adrien Brody collaborating on the score with the Newton Brothers. In 2018, Eigsti was featured on a television special with Chris Botti for PBS's Great Performances.

Eigsti has performed, toured, or recorded with Dave Brubeck, Chris Botti, Joshua Redman, Julian Lage, David Benoit, Terence Blanchard, Becca Stevens, James Moody, Esperanza Spalding, Lisa Fischer, Ernestine Anderson, Red Holloway, Kurt Rosenwinkel, Diane Schuur, Ambrose Akinmusire, Ben Wendel, Marian McPartland, Christian McBride, Nicholas Payton, Joshua Bell, Chris Potter, Stefon Harris, Sting, John Mayer, Hank Jones, Chick Corea, Snarky Puppy, Vanessa Williams, McCoy Tyner, Joey DeFrancesco, Charles McPherson, Geoffrey Keezer, Eldar Djangirov, Joe Lovano, The Doobie Brothers, and Frederica von Stade, among many others. 

In addition to leading and performing with various small ensembles, Eigsti frequently has had the opportunity to work with, compose for and orchestrate music for various symphony orchestras, and has written music for orchestra and jazz ensemble. Various soloist and compositional features include the San José Chamber Orchestra, Oakland Symphony, New York Philharmonic, the New York Pops, Chicago Symphony Orchestra, Colorado Symphony, Buffalo Philharmonic Orchestra, Naples Philharmonic, Nashville Symphony, Sacramento Philharmonic Orchestra, Boston Youth Symphony Orchestras, Pittsburgh Symphony Orchestra, Indianapolis Symphony Orchestra, San Jose Youth Symphony, Golden State Youth Orchestra, Bear Valley Music Festival Orchestra, Tassajara Symphony, Reno Philharmonic and multiple featured collaborations with the Peninsula Symphony Orchestra.

Albums as a bandleader

Eigsti released his first album Tay's Groove at age 14. It featured Seward McCain on bass and Dan Brubeck on drums. Eigsti's second album, Live At Filoli, with John Shifflett on bass and Jason Lewis on drums, was recorded at a concert at Filoli Gardens on September 16, 2000. The trio played this concert as a last minute replacement for a Marian McPartland show. His third album, Taylor's Dream, was released in 2001 on DIW Records. Eigsti's first nationally released album was Resonance, recorded in 2003 and released on Bop City Records. It was the trio's third album together and peaked at number five in national jazz radio airplay.

Eigsti's first major label debut was titled Lucky To Be Me. It was released on Concord Records in 2006. Lucky To Be Me features Julian Lage on guitar, Christian McBride on bass, and Lewis Nash on drums. The album received two Grammy Award nominations - one for Best Instrumental Composition on for his song "Argument", and the other for Best Jazz Solo Performance on "Freedom Jazz Dance". The album met with critical acclaim, but it was also criticized for being uneven. In 2008 Eigsti released Let It Come To You, his second release with the Concord label. This album featured Julian Lage on guitar, Reuben Rogers on bass, Eric Harland on drums, Harish Raghavan on bass and Aaron McLendon on drums. Additionally, Joshua Redman, Edmar Castaneda, Dayna Stephens, Ben Wendel, and Evan Francis are featured as guests. Eigsti's next Concord album, Daylight at Midnight, was released on September 21, 2010. This album features vocalist Becca Stevens and several arrangements of contemporary popular artists like Rufus Wainwright, Imogen Heap, and Elliott Smith.

On May 21, 2021 Eigsti released Tree Falls through GSI records. The album features drummer Eric Harland, who co-owns the GSI label, vocalists Becca Stevens,  Casey Abrams  and Gretchen Parlato, and bass guitarist David "DJ" Ginyard.  The album won a Grammy for Best Contemporary Instrumental Album.

Discography

As leader

As sideman 

With Eric Harland
 Voyager: Live by Night (Space Time, 2011) – recorded in 2008
 Vipassana (GSI, 2014)

With Gretchen Parlato
 The Lost and Found (ObliqSound, 2011)
 Live in NYC (Obliqsound, 2013)[CD, DVD-Video] – live

With Anton Schwartz
 Radiant Blue (Anton Jazz, 2006)
 Flash Mob (Anton Jazz, 2014)

With Kendrick Scott
 Conviction (Concord Jazz, 2013)
 We Are the Drum (Blue Note, 2015)
 A Wall Becomes a Bridge (Blue Note, 2019)

With Dayna Stephens
 The Timeless Now (CTA, 2007)
 That Nepenthetic Place (Sunnyside, 2013)

With others
 David Benoit, Jazz for Peanuts (Peak, 2008)
 Julian Lage, Sounding Point (EmArcy, 2009)
 Bongwool Lee, My Singing Fingers (Origin, 2018)
 Matt Slocum, With Love And Sadness (Sunnyside, 2022)
 J. D. Walter, Dressed in a Song (JWALREC, 2020)
 Ben Wendel, Simple Song (Sunnyside, 2009)
 Dann Zinn, Day of Reckoning (Origin, 2019)

References

External links
Official website
Taylor Eigsti and the Prodigy Thing

[ All Music]
Jazz History Database

1984 births
Living people
American jazz pianists
American male pianists
USC Thornton School of Music alumni
Stanford University staff
People from Menlo Park, California
21st-century American pianists
21st-century American male musicians
American male jazz musicians
Jazz musicians from California